The following were Mayors of the town of Reading, in the English county of Berkshire.

Fourteenth century

Fifteenth century

Sixteenth century

Seventeenth century

Eighteenth century

Nineteenth century

Twentieth century

Twenty-first century

References

 
Reading
Mayor of Reading